F lead may refer to:

F lead (pencil), a classification of pencil
F connector, used for satellite television